Lou Hickey (born Mhairi-Louise Hickey) is a singer-songwriter from Neilston, Scotland. She has been working as a solo artist since 2006 and in 2008, joined Jon Lawler from the Fratellis in a band called Codeine Velvet Club which disbanded in 2010. Since then, Lou has recorded her debut album.

Musical career

New Shoes and Do It Yourself (2006–08) 
Lou began her time as a musician building up her solo career, which involved performing with Club Noir, the world's biggest burlesque club, as a singer. She spent many years in the Glasgow music scene building up her profile and recording two EPs in this time. As a student, Lou learned about engineering and mixing and took this into her "Do It Yourself" ethic when recording her EPs, which were entitled New Shoes and Do It Yourself (released December 2007). New Shoes cannot be found on any digital download or physical form and is hard to obtain, whereas Do It Yourself remains on iTunes but cannot be bought physically.

During this time, Lou was given a grant by the Scottish Arts Council to record her debut album, but this was eventually put on hold so Lou could pursue a new project called Codeine Velvet Club.

Codeine Velvet Club (2008–10) 
Lou met fellow Glaswegian musician Jon Lawler in 2008 thanks to her friend Heather Donnelly (Lawler's wife). Donnelly told Lawler about Lou and asked if he wanted to write a song with her for her debut album; Lawler agreed and the pair met and wrote the song "Vanity Kills". As Lawler was unable to give the song away, he suggested the pair see how many more songs they could write and form a band.

The duo recorded their debut album in 2009 while Lawler's band, The Fratellis, were taking a break. They recruited various session musicians to help record the album and eventually recruited a live setup in the form of Lewis Gordon, Ross MacFarlane and Will Foster. They toured the UK during the end of 2009 and did a brief tour of the US in early 2010, before Lawler announced he would be giving the project up, leaving Lou to go onto his solo work. Disappointed with the end of the band, Lou went back to her solo work.

True Love Ways (2010–present) 
After the demise of Codeine Velvet Club, Lou used her grant from the Scottish Arts Council to record her debut album in May 2010. She had a week-long session to record most of the album, with extra sessions being squeezed in when she could. As with her previous EPs, Lou has produced, engineered and mixed the album.

The album was delayed for various reasons during 2011 and 2012, before it was confirmed that the title of the album is to be True Love Ways, with a digital release date of Monday 13 May, with a CD release to be confirmed. There was an analog release of an edition of 550 records by Vinyl Frontier Records on Record Store Day, 29 November 2013.

Discography

With Codeine Velvet Club 
 Codeine Velvet Club (2009)

As a solo artist 
EP's
 Does It Get Easier EP (2007)
 Do It Yourself EP (2007)
 Minutes, Hours, Days EP (2011)

Albums
 True Love Ways (2013)

References 

Living people
21st-century Scottish women singers
Year of birth missing (living people)